Ruben Pascal Sança (born December 13, 1986) is a Cape Verdean long-distance runner who specializes in the marathon. He attended and ran for the University of Massachusetts Lowell, after which he began training under Gary Gardner as a member of the Whirlaway Racing Team. Sança is the current Cape Verdean record-holder at 3,000 m indoors at 8:07.50, the 5000 m indoors at 13:56.46, the 5000 m outdoors at 14:05.39, road 5 km at 14:11 and the marathon at 2:18:47. He was one of three members of the 2012 Cape Verdean Olympic team.

Running career
At the 2012 Summer Olympics, he competed in the men's 5000 metres, finishing 40th overall in Round 1, failing to qualify for the final. Soon after the London Olympics, he underwent knee surgery to remove a benign tumor in his right knee, which had affected him throughout the Olympics. He returned to the marathon on April 21, 2014, finishing in 21st place with a time of 2:19:05 at the 2014 Boston Marathon.

Major competition record

Personal bests

External links
Official Website 

Ruben Sança: London 2012 Olympian
Ruben Sanca Runs to Gold in the Lusofonia Games

Video
Interview: Ruben Sanca: UMass Lowell - World Class Runner
Training: Emily Maye // Tracksmith: Ruben Sanca
Hall of Fame: UMass Lowell: Hall of Fame Speech

References

1986 births
Living people
People from Sal, Cape Verde
Cape Verdean male long-distance runners
Olympic athletes of Cape Verde
Athletes (track and field) at the 2012 Summer Olympics
Cape Verdean male marathon runners
Athletes (track and field) at the 2019 African Games
African Games competitors for Cape Verde